Fasharak (also Romanized as Fashārak, Fashārk, Feshārak, and Feshārk) is a village in Zefreh Rural District, Kuhpayeh District, Isfahan County, Isfahan Province, Iran. At the 2006 census, its population was 115, in 53 families.

References 

Populated places in Isfahan County